The John Orendorff Farm is a historic home and farm complex located at Westminster, Carroll County, Maryland, United States. The complex consists of a brick house, a brick privy, a brick smokehouse, a frame barn, a frame hog pen, a frame wagon shed, two poultry houses, and a feed house. The house is a five-by-two-bay brick structure, built in 1861 in the Italianate style. It has a -story, six-by-two-bay brick ell on the north side.

The John Orendorff Farm was listed on the National Register of Historic Places in 1997.

References

External links
, including photo from 1995, at Maryland Historical Trust

Farms on the National Register of Historic Places in Maryland
Houses in Carroll County, Maryland
Houses completed in 1861
Italianate architecture in Maryland
Westminster, Maryland
1861 establishments in Maryland
National Register of Historic Places in Carroll County, Maryland